The 2017–18 Antigua and Barbuda Premier Division was the 47th season of the Antigua and Barbuda top-flight football league. The season began on 12 November 2017 and ended on 18 March 2018.

Hoppers won their second title, and their first since 2016, after defeating Parham, 1–0, on the final match day.

Clubs

Standings
Final table.

Relegation playoffs
The eighth placed team in the Premier Division (Old Road) played a single round robin with the third and fourth placed teams from the First Division (Fort Road and Willikies, respectively). The winner of the round robin earned the right to play in the following years Premier Division, while the remaining teams would play in the First Division. At the end of playoffs, Old Road retained their spot in the Premier Division, and Fort Road and Willikies returned to the First Division.

References

External links 
 http://antiguafootball.com/leagues-ta/premier-league/ 

1
Antigua
Antigua and Barbuda Premier Division seasons